Donald Hill (1922–1994) was an English engineer and historian of science and technology. 

Donald or Don Hill may also refer to:

 Don Hill (American football) (1904–1967), American football player
 Donald Hill (cricketer) (born 1940), New Zealand cricketer
 Don Hill (politician) (born 1944), member of the Kansas House of Representatives
Donnie Hill (born 1960), baseball player
The Donalds, hills in the Scottish Lowlands
Donald's Hill, a hill in the middle of County Londonderry, Northern Ireland